Colortrak 2000 was a brand name used for RCA's high-end television models produced from the early-1980s to the early 1990s. Colortrak 2000 was situated above the less expensive Colortrak line, but below the more expensive Dimensia line. As opposed to ColorTrak, ColorTrak 2000 models incorporated a comb filter, which provided a sharper picture.  The Colortrak 2000 chassis was identical to the Dimensia tabletop model. Colortrak 2000s with BNC connectors were given the designation of Lyceum TVs. This TV set was also used with RCA's Digital Command Component System released in 1985.

Features

Colortrak 2000s had a wide array of high-end features such as a large input/output panel on the back, which included BNC connections, and advanced video features. The Colortrak 2000s from 1983 and later came with the Digital Command Center, a large and very advanced remote control. The same remote was also used for all the Dimensias, except it was called Dimensia Intelligent Audio Video.

See also 

 RCA Dimensia
 Lyceum TV
 Digital Command Center
 Colortrak

References

External links 
 RCA Dimensia Channel on YouTube
 RCA Dimensia Facebook page

RCA brands
Television technology
Television sets